Recurrent palmoplantar hidradenitis is primarily a disorder of healthy children and young adults, characterized by lesions that are primarily painful, subcutaneous nodules on the plantar surface, resembling erythema nodosum.

See also 
 List of cutaneous conditions
 Hidradenitis

References 

Conditions of the skin appendages

ca:PlayStation palmar hidradenitis
fr:Palmare PlayStation Hidradenitis
ja:手掌プレイステーション汗腺炎